Charles Edward Faxon (January 21, 1846 – February 6, 1918) was an American botanical artist and instructor of botany born in Jamaica Plain, Massachusetts. 

In 1867 he received his degree in civil engineering from Lawrence Scientific School in Cambridge. From 1879 to 1884, he taught classes in botany at the Bussey Institute.

Faxon was knowledgeable in regards to the flora of New England, and in 1882 joined the staff at the Arnold Arboretum. Here he took charge of development of the herbarium and library. He worked closely with Charles Sprague Sargent (1841–1927), the director of the arboretum.

Publications 
Faxon created 744 plates for illustration of Sargent's "Silva of North America". In addition to these drawings, he provided the illustrative work for the following publications by Sargent:
 "Manual of the Trees of North America (exclusive of Mexico)", (664 illustrations).
 "Garden and Forest", (285 illustrations).
 "Forest Flora of Japan", (1894).
 "Trees and Shrubs: Illustrations of New Or Little Known Ligneous Plants", (1902–13).

References

External links 
 
 
 Harvard University Library, Papers of Charles Edward Faxon, 1882–1918
 Works by or about Charles Edward Faxon in the Biodiversity Heritage Library

Botanical illustrators
Artists from Boston
1846 births
1918 deaths
Harvard School of Engineering and Applied Sciences alumni
Arnold Arboretum
Harvard University staff
19th-century American painters
American male painters
20th-century American painters
American botanists
19th-century American male artists
People from Jamaica Plain
20th-century American male artists